Hundreds of Days is the second studio album by American harpist Mary Lattimore. It was released on May 18, 2018 under Ghostly International.

Critical reception
Hundreds of Days was met with generally favorable reviews from critics. At Metacritic, which assigns a weighted average rating out of 100 to reviews from mainstream publications, this release received an average score of 80, based on 9 reviews.

Accolades

Track listing

References

2018 albums
Mary Lattimore albums
Ghostly International albums